Charles Cary Rumsey (August 29, 1879 – September 21, 1922) was an American sculptor and an eight-goal polo player.

Early life
Rumsey was born on August 29, 1879 in Buffalo, New York.  He was the son of Laurence Dana Rumsey, a successful local businessman, and Jennie (née Cary) Rumsey.  His siblings included Evelyn Rumsey, who married Rev. Walter R. Lord in 1922; Gertrude Rumsey, who married Carlton Smith; Grace Rumsey, who married Charles W. Goodyear Jr. (son of Charles W. Goodyear) in 1908; and Laurence Dana Rumsey Jr.

His maternal uncles included Seward Cary, a polo-player, and George Cary, a prominent architect.  His maternal great-grandfather was Trumbull Cary, a New York State Senator and former New York State Bank Commissioner.

As a child, Charles learned to play polo at a young age from his uncle and friend, Devereux Milburn.  Charles Rumsey, who was known to his family & friends as Pad, graduated from Harvard University and studied art at the Boston Art School before going to Paris, France, in 1902 to study at the École des Beaux-Arts, where his uncle, George Cary, studied from 1886 until 1889.

Career
While still a student at Harvard, he exhibited a sculpture of an Indian at the Pan-American Exposition in Buffalo in 1901.

He worked mainly in bronze. His passion for horses saw him create statues of the Thoroughbred horses Hamburg and Burgomaster for Harry Payne Whitney, Good and Plenty for Thomas Hitchcock, and World Champion trotter Nancy Hanks for John E. Madden.

When Rumsey returned from Paris in 1906, he established himself in an art studio on 59th Street in New York City. He soon thereafter began sculptures for the massive house being built by architects Carrère and Hastings for the railroad magnate E.H. Harriman, called Arden; he did a fireplace surround and other sculptural decorations for the music room there, as well as the "Three Graces Fountain." During this time he courted Harriman's daughter, Mary Harriman; they both shared a love of horses and had first met at the Meadow Brook Steeplechase Association races on Long Island. They married in 1910, much to the surprise of New York society. They maintained a home in Brookville, New York on Long Island, where they raised three children.

Among Rumsey's other works, he did a statue of Francisco Pizarro erected in Trujillo, Spain, the Brownsville War Memorial in Brownsville, Brooklyn, a copy of the "Three Graces Fountain" from Arden House installed in Mirror Lake at Forest Lawn Cemetery, Buffalo (where Rumsey is buried), and the controversial figure of a nude woman called  "The Pagan." Perhaps his most celebrated work is the 1916 frieze on Carrère and Hastings' Manhattan Bridge in New York City, titled "Buffalo Hunt."

Service in World War I and later life
During World War I, Charles Rumsey served as a captain with Headquarters Troop, 77th Infantry Division and Fortieth Engineers, United States Army Corps of Engineers. His brother, Laurence Dana Rumsey, Jr. (1885–1967), was a pilot in the War with the famous Lafayette Escadrille and Lafayette Flying Corps.

His work was part of the sculpture event in the art competition at the 1928 Summer Olympics.

Personal life

In 1910, Rumsey married Mary Harriman (1881–1934), the founder of The Junior League for the Promotion of Settlement Movements, later known as the Junior League of the City of New York of the Association of Junior Leagues International Inc.  Mary was the daughter of railroad magnate E.H. Harriman and sister to W. Averell Harriman, former New York state governor and United States diplomat. In 2015 she was posthumously inducted into the National Women's Hall of Fame.
Together they had three children:

 Charles Cary Rumsey, Jr. (1911–2007),
 Mary Averell Rumsey (b. 1913), who made her debut in 1932 at a party with over 1,100 guests.
 Bronson Harriman Rumsey (1917–1939), who died when the plane he was riding in, along with Daniel S. Roosevelt, hit a mountain slope near Guadalupe Victoria, Puebla, Mexico. Roosevelt was the son of Hall Roosevelt and nephew of Eleanor Roosevelt.

On September 21, 1922, Charles Rumsey was a passenger in an automobile that crashed into a stone bridge abutment on the Jericho Turnpike near Floral Park on Long Island. He was thrown from the vehicle and died minutes later from his injuries. Rumsey was buried at Forest Lawn Cemetery in Buffalo, New York.

He was posthumously inducted into the Museum of Polo and Hall of Fame in 2011.

Descendants
Through his eldest son Charles, he was posthumously a grandfather of three, Charles, Peter, and Celia Cary. In 1976, Charles, a graduate of Phillips Exeter, Harvard College and Harvard Law School, married Martha Zec, daughter of Dr. Branko Zec of Beverly Hills, California with Pony Duke (the nephew of Doris Duke) as best man. Cary, a lawyer in New York, also lived in Wyoming, where he runs the Wood River Ranch, a dude ranch and outfitter.

References

External links

 Profile of Charles Rumsey with photos of his works

1879 births
1922 deaths
Road incident deaths in New York (state)
Harvard University alumni
United States Army personnel of World War I
Artists from Buffalo, New York
New York (state) Democrats
People from Brookville, New York
20th-century American sculptors
20th-century American male artists
American male sculptors
Burials at Forest Lawn Cemetery (Buffalo)
Sculptors from New York (state)
Olympic competitors in art competitions
Harvard Crimson men's ice hockey